Two Cities is a novel by the American writer John Edgar Wideman set in the Pennsylvania cities of Pittsburgh and Philadelphia during the 1990s.

The novel tells the story of Kassima, a widow in mourning for her husband and two sons who died in the streets of Pittsburgh. Martin Mallory is Kassima's tenant, a photographer whose works depict the 50-year history of life in the African American neighborhoods of Pittsburgh and Philadelphia.

Sources
Contemporary Authors Online. The Gale Group, 2005.

1998 American novels
African-American novels
Novels set in Pittsburgh
Novels set in Philadelphia
Houghton Mifflin books
Novels by John Edgar Wideman